A hardy fish is any fish which is easy to maintain in a home aquarium due to its ability to adapt to a wide range of water parameters. Such fish are good starter fish and ideal for 'cycling' an aquarium (i.e. reducing ammonia and nitrites to effectively zero.) 

Examples of hardy freshwater fish include Poecilids such as the guppy, molly, swordtail and platy, most species of betta, zebra danios, and some tetras. Generally, fish are hardy only when they have been tank-bred, since wild-caught fish may take many generations to adapt to life in captivity. 

Fishkeeping